Seward County is the name of two counties in the United States:

 Seward County, Kansas
 Seward County, Nebraska